John XIV may refer to:

 Pope John XIV, ruled in 983–984
 John XIV of Constantinople, ecumenical patriarch in 1334–1347
 Pope John XIV of Alexandria, ruled in 1571–1586